Baloch Nushki Football Club is a professional football club based in the city of Nushki, Balochistan. It was relegated from the Pakistan Premier League in the 2018–19 season.

History 
Baloch Nushki played in the 2006 National Club League and won the tournament. They were promoted to 2007–08 Football Federation League. In the 2014 PFF League, they lost to Pakistan Navy in the final. They were promoted to Pakistan Premier League.

Baloch Nushki were the only club who started in National Club League and went to Pakistan Premier League, from tier 3 to tier 1.

Honours
League
 National Club League
Champions (1): 2006 
PFF League
Champions (1): 2008–09

References

Football clubs in Pakistan
Sport in Balochistan, Pakistan